Duffey Lake Provincial Park is a provincial park in British Columbia, Canada, located at the lake of the same name, which lies along BC Highway 99 just east of the summit of Cayoosh Pass. The lake's inflow and outflow are Cayoosh Creek. The park's highest point is Mount Rohr at the westernmost boundary.

See also

 Geography of British Columbia

References

External links

 BC Parks: Duffey Lake Provincial Park

Provincial parks of British Columbia
Lillooet Country
Lillooet Ranges
1993 establishments in British Columbia
Protected areas established in 1993